Legal Studies  is published for The Society of Legal Scholars (SLS) by Cambridge University Press. It was first published in 1981 and is now recognised as "one of the leading generalist journals in the UK". Legal Studies publishes peer-reviewed scholarly articles, notes, reports, and book reviews. It has been edited by a board located in University of Manchester’s School of Law since 2016. A ranking of UK law journals based on statistical data from the 2001 Research Assessment Exercise uses Legal Studies as the 'benchmark'.

As of 2018, Legal Studies is no longer published by Wiley but published by Cambridge University Press.

References

External links

British law journals
General law journals
English-language journals
Wiley (publisher) academic journals